The Jordan School District Administration Building, at 9361 S. 400 East in Sandy, Utah, was listed on the National Register of Historic Places in 1985.

It was built in PWA Moderne style in 1935 as part of a Public Works Administration project.

It appears that the building no longer exists.

Notes

References

Schools in Utah
PWA Moderne architecture in Utah
National Register of Historic Places in Salt Lake County, Utah
Buildings and structures completed in 1935
1935 establishments in Utah